The 1891 Ohio gubernatorial election was held on November 3, 1891. Republican nominee and future U.S. President William McKinley defeated Democratic incumbent James E. Campbell with 48.61% of the vote.

General election

Candidates
Major party candidates
William McKinley, Republican 
James E. Campbell, Democratic

Other candidates
John J. Seitz, People's
John J. Ashenhurst, Prohibition

Results

References

1891
Ohio
1891 Ohio elections
William McKinley